The 2023 FIM Motocross World Championship is the 67th FIM Motocross World Championship season.

In the MXGP class, Tim Gajser will start the season as the reigning champion after picking up his fifth world title in 2022. The reigning MX2 world champion, Tom Vialle, will not defend his title as he will move to the United States to compete in the AMA Supercross and AMA Motocross championships.

Regulation Changes

Ahead of the start of the 2023 season, promoter Infront Moto Racing announced several regulation changes for the series. The most significant of these included the allocation of championship points for the top-10 finishers of the Saturday qualifying races in both classes. The winner will receive 10 points down to tenth place gaining 1. These points will not count for towards the overall score for the grand prix, but will count towards the championship standings.

In addition to this, entry fees have been lowered and freight allocation has been increased to help teams travel to non-European rounds. The MXGP class will be opened up to more than 40 riders to enter. If more than 40 riders enter a grand prix in the MXGP class, the non-Officially Approved Teams riders will have a separate practice session to the Officially Approved Teams riders. The fastest from this practice will then be allowed to join the Officially Approved Teams riders in the qualifying race.

Race calendar and results
A provisional calendar was released on 11th October 2022.

The championship will be contested over twenty rounds in Europe, Asia and South America.

MXGP

MX2

Grand Prix locations

MXGP

Entry list

Riders Championship 

Points are awarded to the top-ten finishers of the qualifying race, in the following format:

Points are awarded to finishers of the main races, in the following format:

Manufacturers Championship

MX2

Entry list

Riders Championship 

Points are awarded to the top-ten finishers of the qualifying race, in the following format:

Points are awarded to finishers of the main races, in the following format:

Manufacturers Championship

See Also
 2023 FIM Supercross World Championship
 2023 FIM Women's Motocross World Championship
 2023 European Motocross Championship

References 

Motocross World Championship seasons
FIM Motocross
FIM Motocross